Déjà Vu is a point-and-click adventure game set in the world of 1940s hardboiled detective novels and movies. It was released in 1985 for Macintosh – the first in the MacVenture series – and later ported to several other systems, including the Amiga. Initially, the game featured black and white graphics, and later releases introduced color.

Plot and gameplay

The game takes place in Chicago during December 1941. The game character is Theodore "Ace" Harding, a retired boxer working as a private eye.

Ace awakes one morning in a bathroom stall, unable to remember who he is. The bathroom stall turns out to be in Joe's Bar. A dead man is found in an upstairs office, and Ace is about to be framed for the murder. There are some clues as to the identity of the murdered man and to Ace himself. A strap-down chair, mysterious vials, and a syringe are found, suggesting (together with a needle mark on Ace's arm) that an interrogation has taken place.

Outside the bar, Ace encounters adversaries including a mugger, an old acquaintance with a grudge, and the police. Ace's boxing background proves to be a valuable asset. Ace must find addresses around Joe's bar and then make taxi rides to a few locations (including his office) to gather more elements and unravel the story. It involves a kidnapping in which Ace has played some part, but his memory lacks important details.

Ace's memory and mental condition progressively deteriorate, so the player is required to obtain an antidote to the drug that caused the memory loss. After that, Ace has recurring flashbacks filled with information that help the player to evaluate the evidence and take action accordingly. The memory deterioration is handled differently in the Nintendo platforms compared to all others, in all others the player has a limited amount of time before Ace's brain reaches vegetable status and has to live the rest of his days in a hospital for "helpless mental invalids" with a hard death coded on the second floor of Sternwood Mansion. Nintendo platforms mostly remove the vegetable status mechanic and also removes the Sternwood Mansion death if the player goes there without curing their amnesia giving the player all the time they need to get cured but instead has a hard death coded if the player goes to Ace's office while still suffering from amnesia in which the vegetable ending from the other platforms is immediately initiated. These changes apply to both the Nintendo and Gameboy Color versions.

This game and its sequel, Deja Vu II: Lost in Las Vegas, require significant lateral thinking. Some situations are based in common detective techniques, while others require simple violence. Unlike other MacVentures titles (such as Uninvited and Shadowgate), no supernatural events are involved.

Technology

Déjà Vu was the first ICOM Simulations to use the MacVenture interface and engine.

Numerous ports were made, including versions for home computer systems in 1987 and the Nintendo Entertainment System in 1990. Versions of the game and its sequel containing new graphics and sound were released for Microsoft Windows in the early 1990s, and later as a combined single-cartridge release for the Game Boy Color in 1999 under the title Déjà Vu I & II: The Casebooks of Ace Harding, which was also released for DOS, Windows 3.x (1992), and Windows Mobile (2002). The Game Boy Color version has even more censorship and creates its own detail such as renaming "Joe's Bar" to "Joe's Place" and adding details that were not present in other versions to the point of contradiction, most notably with Ace's "Suzy Q" memory and "Father O'Malley" memory. This version also changes the ending of Deja Vu 1 to better seamlessly lead into Deja Vu II.

Reception
Digital Press gave the NES version 6 out of 10, approving the puzzle-solving while have average opinions on graphics and music.

The game was named the Best Entertainment Product by the Software Publishers Association 1986.

Notes

External links

Déjà Vu on the Amiga at The Hall of Light (HOL)

1985 video games
Adventure games
Amiga games
Apple IIGS games
Atari ST games
Commodore 64 games
Detective video games
DOS games
First-person adventure games
ICOM Simulations games
Classic Mac OS games
NEC PC-9801 games
Neo-noir video games
Nintendo Entertainment System games
Windows games
Organized crime video games
Point-and-click adventure games
Video games about amnesia
Video games developed in the United States
Video games set in 1941
Video games set in Chicago
Single-player video games
Kemco games
Mindscape games